Mokbul Hossain (Bengali:মোকবুল হসেন), also known as Maqbul Hossain Santu, was Jatiya Party (Ershad) politician and the Member of Parliament of Pabna-2. He was a presidium of the Jatiya Party (Ershad).

Career
Hossain fought in the Bangladesh Liberation War.

Hossain was elected to parliament from Pabna-2 as a Jatiya Party candidate in 1986. He was re-elected in 1988. He served as the chairperson of the Pabna District Council.

Death 
Hossain died on 28 August 2021 in Shimla Hospital and Diagnostic Center in Pabna District, Bangladesh. He was buried in Arifpur graveyard.

References

1943 births
2021 deaths
Jatiya Party politicians
3rd Jatiya Sangsad members
People from Pabna District
Mukti Bahini personnel